Christina Mikkelsen (born 19 September 1992) is a Danish model and beauty pageant titleholder who won Miss Universe Denmark 2016. She represented Denmark at the Miss Universe 2016 in Manila, Philippines on 30 January 2017, but later was dethroned in February 2017 due to accusations of money laundering in Equatorial Guinea.

Pageantry
On 14 May 2016 Mikkelsen was also crowned Miss Universe Denmark 2016.

References

External links
Official site

1992 births
Living people
Miss Universe 2016 contestants
People from Copenhagen
Danish beauty pageant winners
Danish female models